Obergfellia is an extinct genus of stem perissodactyl from the middle Eocene, discovered in 1980. Its known range includes northern India and Pakistan.

Cooper et al. (2014) erected the genus using specimens formerly assigned to Anthracobune and Pilgrimella. It is named in honor of the late married vertebrate paleontologists Friedlinde Obergfell and A. Ranga Rao.

The suite of features that distinguish it from other anthracobunids are broad lower molars, short lower m3, and a fairly long angular process of the mandible, but not as long as in Anthracobune.

References 

Prehistoric odd-toed ungulates
Eocene odd-toed ungulates
Eocene mammals of Asia
Fossils of India
Fossils of Pakistan
Fossil taxa described in 2014
Prehistoric placental genera